The Downing Building is a historic commercial building in downtown Bend, Oregon, United States. It was built in 1920.

The building was listed on the National Register of Historic Places in 2004.

It was the location of The Bus Depot during the 1980s.

See also
 National Register of Historic Places listings in Deschutes County, Oregon

References

External links

1920 establishments in Oregon
Buildings designated early commercial in the National Register of Historic Places
Commercial buildings completed in 1920
National Register of Historic Places in Bend, Oregon